John Fitch Hill House is a historic home located at Indianapolis, Indiana.  It was built about 1852, and is a two-story, five bay, Italianate style frame dwelling.  It has a low hipped roof with double brackets and a centered gable.  It features a full-width front porch added in the 1880s.

It was listed on the National Register of Historic Places in 2004.

References

External links

Houses on the National Register of Historic Places in Indiana
Italianate architecture in Indiana
Houses completed in 1852
Houses in Indianapolis
National Register of Historic Places in Indianapolis
1852 establishments in Indiana